Fulgencio is a Spanish male given name. It is derived from the Latin name Fulgentius, which means "bright, brilliant".

People

First name
Fulgentius of Cartagena (?–c. 630), Bishop of Écija, Hispania
Fulgentius of Ruspe  (462 or 467–527 or 533), Bishop of Ruspe, North Africa
Fulgencio Aquino (1915–1994), Venezuelan musician and songwriter
Fulgencio Argüelles (born 1955), Spanish writer and psychologist
Fulgencio Batista (1901–1973), President and dictator of Cuba
Fulgencio Berdugo (1918–2003), Colombian footballer
Fulgencio Coll Bucher (born 1948), Spanish general
Fulgencio R. Moreno (1872–1933), Paraguayan journalist, financial expert, statesman and historian
Fulgencio Vega (1805–1868), Supreme Director of Nicaragua
Fulgencio Yegros (1780–1821), Paraguayan soldier and first head of state of independent Paraguay
Fulgencio Zúñiga (born 1977), Colombian professional boxer

Surname
Edgardo Fulgencio (1917–2004), Filipino basketball player
Ruth Aguilar Fulgencio (born 1975), Spanish Paralympic athlete

Geography
San Fulgencio, village in Alicante, Spain

Film and TV
Don Fulgencio, 1950 Argentine film
Fulgencio (Modern Family), character in Modern Family
Fulgencio Capulet, character in Romeo + Juliet

Spanish masculine given names